Double Rainbow was a viral video filmed by Paul "Bear" Vasquez (September 5, 1962 – May 9, 2020). The clip, filmed in his front yard just outside Yosemite National Park, in the U.S. state of California, shows his ecstatic reaction to a double rainbow. , Vasquez's video had accumulated more than 50 million views on YouTube.

Biography
Vasquez was a native of East Los Angeles, where he served as a Los Angeles County firefighter. After two years, he re-settled in Yosemite in 1985, eventually buying an  plot. He was married with two children, before divorcing, becoming a truck driver, and participating in a single mixed martial arts bout.

Death
In a May 3, 2020 Facebook post, Vasquez spoke of feeling feverish and having trouble breathing. However, he refrained from going to a hospital, as he looked forward to reincarnating and "enjoying the ride". On May9, Vasquez died in the emergency room of John C. Fremont Hospital in Mariposa, California. Vasquez was tested for COVID-19 but no results have yet been released.

History
The amateur video shows the view from Vazquez's property into the skies above the Yosemite Valley on January 8, 2010. After moving away from several trees that interfere with the scene, Vazquez enjoys an unobstructed view of a semicircular double rainbow. Vasquez's reaction captures his intense emotional excitement; he weeps with joy and moans ecstatically, uttering phrases such as "Double rainbow all the way across the sky," "What does this mean?" and "Too much!"

Vasquez posted the video to YouTube himself as user Hungrybear9562 (now Yosemitebear62) on January8, 2010. On July3, comedian and late-night talk show host Jimmy Kimmel linked to the video in a post on Twitter, saying that he and a friend had declared it the "funniest video in the world." The video quickly gained over one million views. 

A July 16 feature on the video by CNN.com stated that the video had gained 4.8 million views. The video gained Vasquez a feature on the comedy show Tosh.0. ABC News describes the video as "a three-and-a-half-minute emotional journey," with Vasquez confirming his sobriety during recording.

On July 26, 2010, Bear was interviewed by Kimmel on Jimmy Kimmel Live!. On the December16 episode, he was awarded Video of the Year and appeared in a video short created by the show for the event.

Aftermath

On July 5, 2010, the Gregory Brothers auto-tuned the video under the name "Double Rainbow Song". Their video has since gotten over 39 million views and has become a viral video in itself, almost surpassing the original in number of views. The song was covered by Amanda Palmer, Jimmy Fallon (as Neil Young) and The Axis of Awesome during a live recording of a charity show in the UK.

In 2011, Vasquez appeared in a commercial for Vodafone New Zealand, parodying the video.

The video appears as the first scene of the 2013 movie We're the Millers. Two years earlier, Bear had appeared in Jennifer Aniston's ad for Smartwater.

On May 9, 2016, Bear appeared on the Slooh.com live broadcast of the Transit of Mercury.

This video was featured in 2016 YouTube's April Fool prank and it can be watched with Snoop Dogg in 360 "SnoopaVision".

References

External links
The original video, titled 
Professional MMA record for Paul Vasquez from Sherdog

2010 works
2010 YouTube videos
Viral videos
Internet memes introduced in 2010
2010 in California
Rainbows in culture